Herbert Island is an island in the Islands of Four Mountains subgroup of the Aleutian archipelago.

References

External links

Islands of Four Mountains
Calderas of Alaska
Islands of Alaska
Islands of Unorganized Borough, Alaska
Landforms of Aleutians West Census Area, Alaska
Volcanoes of Unorganized Borough, Alaska
Volcanoes of Alaska

pl:Herbert (wyspa)